Fesser is a surname. Notable people with the surname include:

Franciszek Fesser (1885–1956), Polish coal miner, trade unionist and politician
Guillermo Fesser (born 1960), Spanish journalist
Javier Fesser (born 1964), Spanish film director
Klaus Fesser, German physicist

See also 
 Feser